The Embassy of the Republic of Indonesia in Canberra is the diplomatic mission of Indonesia in Australia, which also doubles as the former's mission to Vanuatu. The current ambassador, Siswo Pramono, took office in October 2021.

Consulate Generals of Indonesia are also present in the cities of Sydney, Melbourne, Perth and Darwin.

History
Indonesia's first representative in Australia, Usman Sastroamidjojo, was assigned in June 1947 during the Indonesian National Revolution as "chief of the diplomatic and consular service for the Indonesian Republic". Initially located in Melbourne, the representation moved to Canberra in 1949, moving from Hotel Canberra to Deakin before permanently establishing itself in the current embassy location at Yarralumla in August 1971. The building itself had commenced construction since January 1970. The original building was designed by George Holland, and featured a display pavilion called "Wisma Wista Budaya". An additional office block was constructed between 1983 and 1984. A second display hall, named "Balai Kartini" after Kartini, was completed in 1986.

The embassy was targeted by a bioterrorism hoax in 2005 during the trial of Schapelle Corby. In 2015, a week after the executions of Andrew Chan and Myuran Sukumaran, a HAZMAT team was called to the embassy due to presence of a suspicious package containing white powder.

Gallery

See also

 Australia–Indonesia relations
 Indonesian ambassadors to Australia
 Embassy of Australia, Jakarta
 Australian ambassadors to Indonesia
 Australian Consulate-General, Surabaya
 Consuls-General of Australia
 Diplomatic missions in Australia
 Diplomatic missions of Indonesia

References

External links
 
 
 
 
 

Canberra
Indonesia
Australia–Indonesia relations
1971 establishments in Australia
Buildings and structures completed in 1971